Bertie Verley (28 December 1873 – 14 January 1907) was a Jamaican cricketer. He played in five first-class matches for the Jamaican cricket team from 1894 to 1897.

See also
 List of Jamaican representative cricketers

References

External links
 

1873 births
1907 deaths
Jamaican cricketers
Jamaica cricketers
Sportspeople from Kingston, Jamaica